"Dinata" or "Dynata" is a song from the album Meno Ektos; its music was composed by Ara Dinkjian, its lyrics written by Lina Nikolakopoulou and it was first sung by Eleftheria Arvanitaki while Arto Tuncboyaciyan features in non verbal singing and percussion in some versions and performances of it; it mixes the influence of Balkan, Greek and Armenian music with electronics. This song, among the others on Meno Ektos, improved Arvanitaki's name recognition in Greece;  a notable performance of it by her was at the closing ceremony of the 2004 Athens Olympics, during the fireworks and after the flame had been extinguished.

Alternative versions

Various versions of "Dinata" exist. The song or rather the music was first published in 1986 as an instrumental piece by Night Ark (see below), whence its "official" English title, i.e. Homecoming.

Night Ark
Ara Dinkjian is a founding member of the band or instrumental jazz quartet Night Ark; their most famous piece is Homecoming which can be first found on their 1986 album Picture.

French
A French version of the song was recorded by Demis Roussos on the 1997 album Mon Ile with French lyrics by Koraz.

Track listing

French single
"Dinata" (Radio Edit) - 3:37
"Dinata" - 4:12
"Mon Ile" - 4:16

Antique

"Dinata Dinata" was covered by Greek-Swedish duo Antique. It was released in November 1999 as the second single from their debut album, Mera Me Ti Mera. It reached the top 10 in Romania, Italy and Sweden. In Italy, this song was publicated in 5 December 1999.

Track listing
German and Swedish single
"Dinata Dinata" (Radio Edit) - 3:17
"Dinata Dinata" (Extended Version) - 4:25
"Westoriental Trip" - 4:07

Swedish single
"Dinata Dinata" (Radio Edit) - 3:17
"Set Your Body Free" - 5:28

Swedish promo single
"Dinata Dinata" (C&N Project Mix) - 7:45
"Dinata Dinata" (Jonas S. Club Mix) - 5:06
"Dinata Dinata" (L.O.L. Brothers on a Mission Mix) - 5:14
"Dinata Dinata" (Radio Edit) - 3:18

Charts

Turkish
A Turkish version of the song was released by Sezen Aksu with the title Sarışınım on the 1988 album Sezen Aksu'88.

References

External links
Lyrics of the song translated into English at lyricstranslate.com
Lyrics of the song translated into English at stixoi.info

1991 songs
1999 singles
Greek-language songs
Antique (band) songs
Eleftheria Arvanitaki songs